Burgers Bar ( Burgers Bar) is an Israeli burger chain with 30 locations around Israel, and previously had three locations in the United States.

History
Burgers Bar opened their first location in 1999 in the German Colony of Jerusalem. Due to the restaurants popularity, they began expanding quickly all over Israel. Burgers Bar was able to carve out a niche for themselves and in 2005 became the only nominee in Haaretz's Best Kosher Burger in Israel. Many attribute Burgers Bar's success to them offering burgers at a similar price to McDonald's Israel.

All locations are kosher Mehadrin certified. Additionally they offer a wide variety of toppings and side dishes not found at typical burger restaurants.

American expansion attempt
After experiencing success in Israel with the American tourists, Burgers Bar expanded to the United States with 3 locations. The locations were in Teaneck, Cedarhurst, and Brooklyn however all three locations were closed within a couple of years.

See also

 Culture of Israel
 Israeli cuisine
 Economy of Israel
 List of hamburger restaurants
 List of restaurants in Israel

References

Restaurant chains in Israel
Fast-food hamburger restaurants
Restaurants established in 1998
Israeli companies established in 1998
Food and drink companies of Israel
Restaurants in Jerusalem
Restaurants in Tel Aviv
Food and drink companies established in 1998